Witold Maria Hensel (born March 29, 1917 in Gniezno, died on November 22, 2008, in Warsaw) was a Polish archaeologist. He was a member of the Polish Academy of Sciences and a member of the Sejm in PRL (SD, 1985–1989).

Publications
The Origins of Western and Eastern Slav Towns, Witold Hensel, World Archaeology, Vol. 1, No. 1, Recent Work and New Approaches (Jun., 1969), pp. 51–60 
Polska Starożytna (En:ancient Poland) ;by Witold Hensel ;January 1988, Book, 3rd edition ;   
Excavations of Neolithic and Early Bronze Age Sites in South-Eastern Poland ;by Sarunas Milisauskas, Witold Hensel, Instytut Historii Kultury Materialnej (Polska Akademia Nauk); January 1985; Paperback  ;  
Przemiany Ludnościowe I Kulturowe I Tysiaclecia P.N.E. Na Ziemiach Miedzy Odra a Dnieprem: Materiay Z Polsko-Radzieckiego Sympozjum Paleodemograficznego, Warszawa, 6-9 Grudnia 1977 by Polska Akademia Nauk, Witold Hensel; January 1983, Book ; ;  
Archeologia Medioevale Polacca in Italia ;by Witold Hensel, Stanisaw Tabaczynski ;January 1981, Book ;

References 

1917 births
2008 deaths
People from Gniezno
People from the Province of Posen
Alliance of Democrats (Poland) politicians
Members of the Polish Sejm 1985–1989
20th-century Polish archaeologists
Polish medievalists
Adam Mickiewicz University in Poznań alumni
Academic staff of Adam Mickiewicz University in Poznań
Academic staff of the University of Warsaw
Commanders of the Order of Merit of the Italian Republic
Commanders of the Order of Polonia Restituta
Commanders with Star of the Order of Polonia Restituta
Knights of the Order of Polonia Restituta
Members of the Polish Academy of Sciences
Officers of the Order of Polonia Restituta
Burials at Powązki Cemetery
Recipients of the State Award Badge (Poland)
Recipient of the Meritorious Activist of Culture badge